Poythress is a surname. Notable people with the surname include:

Alex Poythress (born 1993), American-Ivorian basketball player for Maccabi Tel Aviv of the Israeli Premier Basketball League
David Poythress (1943–2017), politician from the U.S. state of Georgia
Rich Poythress (born 1987), American baseball first basemen
Vern Poythress (born 1946), American theologian